The 2002 New England 300 was the 19th stock car race of the 2002 NASCAR Winston Cup Series and the 10th iteration of the event. The race was held on Sunday, July 21, 2002, in Loudon, New Hampshire, at New Hampshire International Speedway, a  permanent, oval-shaped, low-banked racetrack. The race took the scheduled 300 laps to complete. At race's end, Ward Burton, driving for Bill Davis Racing, took advantage of a disaster-stricken Matt Kenseth to win his fifth and final career NASCAR Winston Cup Series win and his second and final win of the season. To fill out the podium, Jeff Green of Richard Childress Racing and Dale Earnhardt Jr. of Dale Earnhardt, Inc. would finish second and third, respectively.

The race was marred by poor track conditions, as the sealer of the racetrack came apart due to a repave the speedway had which affected the corners of the track.

Background 

New Hampshire International Speedway is a 1.058-mile (1.703 km) oval speedway located in Loudon, New Hampshire which has hosted NASCAR racing annually since the early 1990s, as well as an IndyCar weekend and the oldest motorcycle race in North America, the Loudon Classic. Nicknamed "The Magic Mile", the speedway is often converted into a 1.6-mile (2.6 km) road course, which includes much of the oval. The track was originally the site of Bryar Motorsports Park before being purchased and redeveloped by Bob Bahre. The track is currently one of eight major NASCAR tracks owned and operated by Speedway Motorsports.

Entry list 

 (R) denotes rookie driver.

Practice

First practice 
The first practice session was held on Friday, July 19, at 11:20 AM EST, and would last for 2 hours.

Second practice 
The second practice session was held on Saturday, July 20, at 9:30 AM EST, and would last for 45 minutes.

Third and final practice 
The third and final practice session, sometimes referred to as Happy Hour, was held on Saturday, July 20, at 11:15 AM EST, and would last for 45 minutes.

Qualifying 
Qualifying was held on Friday, July 19, at 3:00 PM EST. Each driver would have two laps to set a fastest time; the fastest of the two would count as their official qualifying lap. Positions 1-36 would be decided on time, while positions 37-43 would be based on provisionals. Six spots are awarded by the use of provisionals based on owner's points. The seventh is awarded to a past champion who has not otherwise qualified for the race. If no past champ needs the provisional, the next team in the owner points will be awarded a provisional.

No drivers would fail to qualify.

Full qualifying results

Race results

References 

2002 NASCAR Winston Cup Series
NASCAR races at New Hampshire Motor Speedway
July 2002 sports events in the United States
2002 in sports in New Hampshire